Digital number may refer to:
 Seven-segment display character representations, the "digital" font commonly associated with LED displays on calculators
 Numerical digit, the general concept of a digit-based numbering systems
 Specific digital number systems such as:
 binary numeral system
 octal
 decimal
 hexadecimal
 The pixel value assigned by an analog-to-digital converter

See also 
 List of numeral systems
 Roman numerals, an example of a non-positional numeral system